FC Dynamo Saky (Futbol′nyy klub Dynamo Saky) was a Ukrainian football club from Saky, Crimea. The club was established in Saky raion under the name of Frunzenets.

Team names
 until 1993: FC Frunzenets Frunze
 1993–1994: FC Frunzenets Saky
 1994–1997: FC Dynamo Saky

League and cup history

Soviet Union
{|class="wikitable"
|-bgcolor="#efefef"
! Season
! Div.
! Pos.
! Pl.
! W
! D
! L
! GS
! GA
! P
!Domestic Cup
!colspan=2|Europe
!Notes
|- align=center bgcolor=SteelBlue
|align=center|1990
|align=center|5th KFK Ukrainian SSR Gr. 5
|align=center|5/16
|align=center|30
|align=center|13
|align=center|11
|align=center|6
|align=center|44
|align=center|25
|align=center|37
|align=center|
|align=center|
|align=center|
|align=center|
|- align=center bgcolor=SteelBlue
|align=center|1991
|align=center|5th KFK Ukrainian SSR Gr. 4
|align=center|4/16
|align=center|30
|align=center|17
|align=center|7
|align=center|6
|align=center|48
|align=center|18
|align=center|41
|align=center|
|align=center|
|align=center|
|align=center bgcolor=brick|Reorganization of competitions
|}

Ukraine
{|class="wikitable"
|-bgcolor="#efefef"
! Season
! Div.
! Pos.
! Pl.
! W
! D
! L
! GS
! GA
! P
!Domestic Cup
!colspan=2|Europe
!Notes
|- align=center bgcolor=SteelBlue
|align=center|1992–93
|align=center|4th Transitional League
|align=center|7/18
|align=center|34
|align=center|13
|align=center|11
|align=center|10
|align=center|48
|align=center|29
|align=center|37
|align=center|
|align=center|
|align=center|
|align=center|
|- align=center bgcolor=SteelBlue
|align=center|1993–94
|align=center|4th Transitional League
|align=center bgcolor=silver|2/18
|align=center|34
|align=center|21
|align=center|6
|align=center|7
|align=center|51
|align=center|28
|align=center|48
|align=center| finals
|align=center|
|align=center|
|align=center bgcolor=lightgreen|Promoted
|- align=center bgcolor=PowderBlue
|align=center|1994–95
|align=center|3rd Second League
|align=center|4/22
|align=center|42
|align=center|25
|align=center|5
|align=center|12
|align=center|62
|align=center|33
|align=center|80
|align=center| finals
|align=center|
|align=center|
|align=center|
|- bgcolor=PowderBlue
|align=center|1994–95
|align=center|3rd Second League Gr. B
|align=center|10/21
|align=center|38
|align=center|17
|align=center|8
|align=center|13
|align=center|42
|align=center|36
|align=center|59
|align=center| finals
|align=center|
|align=center|
|align=center|
|- bgcolor=PowderBlue
|align=center|1996–97
|align=center|3rd Second League Gr. B
|align=center|16/17
|align=center|32
|align=center|8
|align=center|8
|align=center|16
|align=center|23
|align=center|43
|align=center|32
|align=center| finals
|align=center|
|align=center|
|align=center bgcolor=pink|Relegated
|- align=center bgcolor=SteelBlue
|align=center|1997–98
|align=center|4th Amateur League Gr. 4
|align=center|9/9
|align=center|0
|align=center|0
|align=center|0
|align=center|0
|align=center|0
|align=center|0
|align=center|0
|align=center|
|align=center|
|align=center|
|align=center bgcolor=lightgrey|Withdrew before seasons start
|}

Honours
Crimea championship (Soviet Lower League Tier)
  1989

References

 
Dynamo Saky
Saky
Association football clubs disestablished in 1997
1997 disestablishments in Ukraine